This article shows statistics of individual players for the football club Dinamo Zagreb. It also lists all matches that Dinamo Zagreb played in the 2009–10 season.

Events

Pre-season
 13 June: Midfielder Mirko Hrgović leaves the club after his contract is terminated on mutual consent. Hrgović spent a single season with the club after being transferred from JEF United in summer 2008.
 19 June: The club releases official confirmation that the 24-year-old Chilean midfielder Pedro Morales contracted swine influenza while visiting Chile. Morales is expected to stay in Chile and join the team upon recovery.
 19 June: Albanian midfielder Emiljano Vila signs for the club from Teuta Durrës for a yet undisclosed fee, on recommendation from Josip Kuže, former manager of Dinamo and Albania.
 26 June: Greek international Dimitrios Papadopoulos signs for the club from Italian side Lecce on a three-year contract.

Season
 14 December: Media reports confirm that the managing board had decided to terminate contracts with Dimitrios Papadopoulos and Leandro Cufré and that they would be free to find new clubs in the winter transfer period. The board also decided to end Denis Glavina's loan and send him back to Vorskla. The board also said cleared a possible transfer of Mario Mandžukić in case Dinamo receive a good offer for him, and the media cited rumours that Dodo would be brought from Inter Zaprešić to replace him.

First-team squad

Current squad

1 player has Croatian citizenship

Kit

|
|
|

Squad statistics
Updated 1 October 2009.

Competitions

Overall

Prva HNL

Classification

Results summary

Results by round

Results by opponent

Source: 2009–10 Prva HNL article

UEFA Europa League

Group A

Matches

Competitive

Last updated 13 May 2010Sources: Prva-HNL.hr, Sportske novosti, Sportnet.hr

Friendlies

Player seasonal records
Competitive matches only. Updated to games played 13 May 2010.

Key

Goalscorers

Source: Competitive matchesA: Sivonjić was loaned out to Inter Zaprešić in the winter transfer period.B: Papadopoulos' contract was terminated just before the winter break, after which he signed for Celta Vigo.C: Lovren was transferred out to Lyon in January 2010.D: Chago was loaned out to Istra 1961 in the winter transfer period.E: Dodo was brought in from Inter Zaprešić in the winter transfer period.

Notes

1. : Second leg of the UEFA Champions League second qualifying round against Pyunik had to be played behind closed doors due to unruly behaviour by Dinamo supporters at their last European away match against Udinese

References

External links
 Dinamo Zagreb official website

2009-10
Croatian football clubs 2009–10 season
2009-10